Eoophyla belladotae is a moth in the family Crambidae. It was described by David John Lawrence Agassiz in 2012. It is found in Kenya, South Africa, Uganda and Zambia.

The wingspan is 16–22 mm. The costa of the forewings is brownish. The remaining area is white. The basal third of the hindwings is concolorous with the forewing. There is a yellow antemedian fascia, followed by a silver-grey fascia, edged with brown. Adults have been recorded on wing from April to June, from August to September and from November to December.

Etymology
The species is named in honour of the wife of the author with the Latin prefix bella (meaning beautiful).

References

Eoophyla
Moths described in 2012